The 1970 Texas Longhorns football team represented the University of Texas at Austin in the 1970 NCAA University Division football season. The Longhorns shared the national championship with Nebraska, their third national championship overall. Texas had previously won consensus national titles in 1963 and 1969.

Utilizing a wishbone option offense, the defending national champion Longhorns won all ten regular season games to extend their winning streak to thirty games. They were again awarded the UPI (coaches) national title, released prior to the bowl games in early December.

On New Year's Day 1971, Texas had a rematch with  Notre Dame in the Cotton Bowl Classic at the Cotton Bowl in Fair Park in Dallas. This time, the sixth-ranked Fighting Irish won 24–11, denying top-ranked Texas a third straight Cotton Bowl victory and consecutive consensus national championship.

Later that day, second-ranked Ohio State lost  to #12 Stanford in the Rose Bowl. That night, third-ranked Nebraska defeated   in the Orange Bowl to give the unbeaten Huskers  the post-bowl AP national championship. Through the 1973 season, the final UPI coaches poll was released prior to the bowl games. (In December 1973, UPI champion Alabama also lost their bowl game.)

Schedule

Game Summaries

vs. California

at Texas Tech

vs. UCLA

vs. Oklahoma

at Rice

vs. SMU

at Baylor

at TCU

vs. Texas A&M

vs. Arkansas

vs. Notre Dame (Cotton Bowl)

Roster

Rankings

NFL Draft
Nine seniors from the 1970 Longhorns were selected in the 1971 NFL Draft:

Two juniors from the 1970 Longhorns were selected in the 1972 NFL Draft:

One sophomore from the 1970 Longhorns was selected in the 1973 NFL Draft:

Awards and honors
Bobby Wuensch, Tackle, Consensus All-American
Steve Worster, Back, Consensus All-American
Bill Atessis, Defensive end, Consensus All-American

References

Texas
Texas Longhorns football seasons
College football national champions
Southwest Conference football champion seasons
Texas Longhorns football